It Can Happen to Anyone is the debut studio album by American neo soul and R&B singer-songwriter Elisabeth Withers, released by Blue Note Records on January 30, 2007.

Track listing

Charts

References

2007 albums
Elisabeth Withers albums
Albums produced by Toby Gad